Nakkalapalem is one of the villages in the State of Andhra Pradesh, India.

References

Villages in Prakasam district